Ignacio Lores Varela (born 26 April 1991) is a Uruguayan footballer who plays as a winger for Italian club Cittadella. He is a former Uruguay U20 international. Lores also holds Spanish passport.

Career
Lores started his football career with Defensor Sporting, making his debut in the Uruguayan Primera División during the 2009–10 season. He made a total of 10 league appearances with the Montevideo-based club.

Palermo

On 9 July 2011, Lores signed with Italian side Palermo on a five-year deal for a fee of €2.8 million. He was given the number 26 jersey. Lores made his Serie A debut in a 3–1 home win against Bologna on 5 November, coming on as a first-half substitute, replacing the injured Abel Hernández early in the first half. Ignacio started his first Serie A match for Palermo in a 0–0 draw against Parma at the Stadio Ennio Tardini on 4 December.

Loans to Botev Vratsa and CSKA Sofia
On 29 August 2012 he moved on loan to Bulgarian A PFG team Botev Vratsa.
After 8 appearances, On 1 February 2013, Lores was loaned out to another A PFG club CSKA Sofia for one-and-a-half year. On 31 March, in a 3–0 home victory over Minyor Pernik, Lores assisted Martin Kamburov for the first goal in a game and later netted his first goal, scoring CSKA's second. He finished the season  with 20 appearances and one goal in the league, scored in the 19th day, and two appearances in the domestic cup.

Return to Palermo and Serie B loans
He returned to Palermo for the 2013–14 season, and played his first game of the season on 11 August 2013 on the occasion of the match in the second round of the Italian Cup won 2–1 on Cremonese.

However, in the January 2014 he moved on loan to Serie B side Bari, making eight appearances in total. On 12 September 2014, he was sent out on loan to another Serie B club, Vicenza, for the full 2014–15 season.

He then signed for Pisa, winning a promotion to Serie B from Lega Pro under coach Gennaro Ivan Gattuso. He left Pisa after two seasons to join another Serie B club, Ascoli, in July 2017.

Peñarol
In July 2018, he returned to Uruguay, signing with Peñarol.

Nacional
After playing the Torneo Apertura with Montevideo Wanderers F.C., he signed with Club Nacional de Football until the end of the season 2020-2021.

Siena
His contract with Siena was terminated by mutual consent on 25 January 2022.

Cittadella
On 25 January 2022, he joined Serie B club Cittadella.

International career
He has been capped by the Uruguay national under-20 football team at the 2011 FIFA U-20 World Cup.

In May 2011 he won the Suwon Cup with Uruguay's National Under-20, playing all three games and scoring one goal – the first in the National – in the second game against Nigeria ended 2–2

References

External links

1991 births
Footballers from Montevideo
Living people
Uruguayan footballers
Uruguay under-20 international footballers
Association football midfielders
Defensor Sporting players
Palermo F.C. players
FC Botev Vratsa players
PFC CSKA Sofia players
S.S.C. Bari players
L.R. Vicenza players
S.S.D. Varese Calcio players
Pisa S.C. players
Ascoli Calcio 1898 F.C. players
Peñarol players
Montevideo Wanderers F.C. players
Club Nacional de Football players
A.C.N. Siena 1904 players
A.S. Cittadella players
Uruguayan Primera División players
Serie A players
Serie B players
Serie C players
First Professional Football League (Bulgaria) players
Uruguayan expatriate footballers
Uruguayan expatriate sportspeople in Italy
Expatriate footballers in Italy
Uruguayan expatriate sportspeople in Bulgaria
Expatriate footballers in Bulgaria